The  was a battle during the Azuchi–Momoyama period (16th century) of Japan. 
The siege of Hiketa Castle was a certain battle that was fought by Sengoku Hidehisa against Chōsokabe Motochika.

In the end however, Motochika won this victory. Hiketa was to be a further stage within the Chōsokabe's conquering of the Shikoku Island.

References

Hiketa 1583
Hiketa 1583
1583 in Japan
Hiketa